Félix Galleguillos Aymani (born 1986) is a Chilean of Atacama descent who was elected as a member of the Chilean Constitutional Convention.

References

External links
Profile at Chile Constituyente

1986 births
Living people
21st-century Chilean politicians
Members of the Chilean Constitutional Convention
Catholic University of the North alumni